Richard C. Johnston is a major general in the United States Air Force.

Career
Johnston was commissioned an officer in 1982. He was given command of the 317th Airlift Group and the 320th Air Expeditionary Wing during the Iraq War before being assigned to the United States Transportation Command in 2004. Later he was given command of the 86th Airlift Wing. In 2009 he was assigned to The Pentagon.

Awards he has received include the Defense Superior Service Medal, the Legion of Merit with two oak leaf clusters, the Bronze Star Medal, the Meritorious Service Medal with four oak leaf clusters, the Air Medal with three oak leaf clusters, the Aerial Achievement Medal, the Air Force Commendation Medal, the Outstanding Unit Award with valor device and two silver oak leaf clusters, the Combat Readiness Medal with four oak leaf clusters, the Southwest Asia Service Medal with two service stars, the Kosovo Campaign Medal, and the Humanitarian Service Medal.

Education
B.A., Criminal Justice – University of Wisconsin-Eau Claire
Graduate – Squadron Officer School
M.S., Operational Research and Business Management – University of Arkansas
Graduate – United States Army Command and General Staff College
Graduate – Air War College
M.S., National Security Strategy – National War College
Graduate, Black Sea Security Program – John F. Kennedy School of Government at Harvard University
Graduate, Program for Senior Managers in Government – John F. Kennedy School of Government at Harvard University

References

Living people
United States Air Force generals
Recipients of the Legion of Merit
Recipients of the Air Medal
United States Air Force personnel of the Gulf War
University of Wisconsin–Eau Claire alumni
University of Arkansas alumni
Harvard Kennedy School alumni
National War College alumni
Recipients of the Defense Superior Service Medal
1957 births